WJPN-LP is a Locally-based Catholic Religious formatted broadcast radio station licensed to Prince William, Virginia, serving Dumfries, Montclair, Quantico and Triangle in Virginia.  WJPN-LP is owned and operated by Saint John Paul the Great Catholic High School.

History
Saint John Paul the Great Catholic High School filed the original application for what would become WJPN-LP on February 10, 2014.  The school spent $250,000 on "permit costs, legal fees, [and] to purchase equipment" for the new station.  The majority of the money spent was to "purchase...stadium lights for [the school's] football field".  One of those very same lights became the "tower" for the station's antenna.

The station was issued the WJPN-LP callsign on May 29, 2015.  Almost a year later, on May 20, 2016, the station began broadcasting for the first time.  Five days later, on May 25, the Federal Communications Commission (FCC) granted the station a "License to Cover", allowing it to officially begin broadcasting.

Programming
Initially, WJPN-LP will simulcast the EWTN Catholic Radio Network while the school builds a studio for the station.  Afterwards, the station will carry local programming and school sports broadcasts.  The school's 2016-2017 curriculum will include a "communications course to teach 25 to 30 interested students about radio broadcasting".

References

External links
 

2016 establishments in Virginia
Catholic radio stations
Radio stations established in 2016
JPN-LP
JPN-LP
Prince William County, Virginia
Catholic Church in Virginia